This is a list of lists of telescopes.

List of astronomical interferometers at visible and infrared wavelengths
List of astronomical observatories
List of highest astronomical observatories
List of large optical telescopes
List of largest infrared telescopes
List of largest optical telescopes historically
List of largest optical telescopes in the 18th century
List of largest optical telescopes in the 19th century
List of largest optical telescopes in the 20th century
List of largest optical reflecting telescopes
List of largest optical refracting telescopes
List of optical telescopes
List of proposed space observatories
List of radio telescopes
List of solar telescopes
List of space telescopes
List of telescopes of Australia
List of largest optical telescopes in the British Isles
List of telescope parts and construction
List of telescope types
List of the largest optical telescopes in North America
List of X-ray space telescopes

See also
 Lists of astronauts
 Lists of astronomical objects
 List of government space agencies
 List of planetariums
 Lists of space scientists
 Lists of spacecraft

External references
Telescope History, NASA Official Website, accessed 02/09/2019
History of the Telescope, accessed 02/09/2019
List of astronomical observatories and telescopes, Encyclopedia Britannica, 02/09/2019
Major Space Telescopes, Space.com, By Andrea Thompson, 05/18/2009
A list of space telescopes, PHYSICS4ME, accessed 02/29/2019
The Biggest Telescopes In The World, World Atlas, accessed 02/29/2019